Cave Creek is a stream in Cooper County in the U.S. state of Missouri. It is a tributary of Petite Saline Creek.

The stream flows to the north-northwest for about four miles and then turns to the northeast. It continues to the northeast for about three miles to its confluence with the Petite Saline Creek near Gooch Mill.

Cave Creek was named for a cave on a bluff above its course.

See also
List of rivers of Missouri

References

Rivers of Cooper County, Missouri
Rivers of Missouri